Moldevatnet (Lake Molde) is the main reservoir and water supply for the city of Molde in Molde Municipality in Møre og Romsdal county, Norway.

See also
List of lakes in Norway

References

Lakes of Møre og Romsdal
Molde
Reservoirs in Norway